Gerris is computer software in the field of computational fluid dynamics (CFD). Gerris was released as free and open-source software, subject to the requirements of the GNU General Public License (GPL), version 2 or any later.

Scope 

Gerris solves the Navier–Stokes equations in 2 or 3 dimensions, allowing to model industrial fluids (aerodynamics, internal flows, etc.) or for instance, the mechanics of droplets, thanks to an accurate formulation of multiphase flows (including surface tension). Actually, the latter field of study is the reason why the software shares the same name as the insect genus.

Gerris also provides features relevant to geophysical flows:
 ocean tide
 tsunamis
 river flow
 eddies in the ocean
 sea state (surface waves)

Flow types #1 to #3 were studied using the shallow-water solver included in Gerris, case #4 brings in the primitives equations and application #5 relies on the spectral equations for generation/propagation/dissipation of swell (and/or wind sea): for this purpose Gerris makes use of the source terms from WaveWatchIII.

Lastly, one can note that the (non-hydrostatic) Navier–Stokes solver was also used in the ocean to study:
 fluvial plumes
 internal waves
 hydrothermal convection

On the contrary Gerris does not allow  the modeling of compressible fluids (supersonic flows).

Numerical scheme 
Several methods can be used to provide a numerical solution to partial differential equations:
 finite differences
 finite volumes
 finite elements
Gerris belongs to the finite volumes family of CFD models.

Type of grid 
Most models use meshes which are either structured (Cartesian or curvilinear grids) or unstructured (triangular, tetrahedral, etc.). Gerris is quite different on this respect: it implements a deal between structured and unstructured meshes by using a tree data structure, allowing to refine locally (and dynamically) the (finite-volume) description of the pressure and velocity fields. Indeed the grid evolves in the course of a given simulation owing to criteria defined by the user (e.g. dynamic refinement of the grid in the vicinity of sharp gradients).

Turbulent closure 
Gerris mainly aims at DNS; the range of Reynolds available to the user thus depends on the computing power they can afford (although the auto-adaptive mesh allows one to focus the computing resources on the coherent structures). According to the Gerris FAQ the implementation of turbulence models will focus on the LES family rather than RANS approaches.

Programming language, library dependencies, included tools 
Gerris is developed in C using the libraries Glib (object orientation, dynamic loading of modules, etc.) and GTS. The latter brings in facilities to perform geometric computations such as triangulation of solid surfaces and their intersection with fluid cells. Moreover Gerris is fully compliant with MPI parallelisation (including dynamic load balancing).

Gerris does not need a meshing tool since the local (and time dependent) refinement of the grid is on charge of the solver itself. As far as solid surfaces are concerned, several input formats are recognized:
 analytic formulas in the parameter file
 GTS triangulated files; note that the Gerris distribution includes a tool to translate the STL format (exported by various CAD software) into GTS triangulated surfaces
 bathymetric/topographic database in KDT format; a tool is also provided to generate such a database from simple ASCII listings

Among the various ways to output Gerris results, let us just mention here:
 Graphical output in PPM format: images can then be converted in (nearly) any format using ImageMagick, and MPEG movies can be generated thanks to FFmpeg (among others).
 Simulation files (.gfs), which are actually parameters files concatenated with fields issued from the simulation; these files can then be (i) re-used as parameter files (defining new initial conditions), or (ii) processed with Gfsview.
 Gfsview, a display software shipped with Gerris, able to cope with the tree structure of the Gerris grid (a data structure which is not efficiently operated by general visualization software).

Licence 
CFD software, as any software, can be developed in various "realms":
 Business;
 Academic;
 Open Source.
As far as CFD is concerned, a thorough discussion of these software development paths can be found in the statement by Zaleski.

Gerris was distributed as free and open-source software right from the onset of the project.

Continued development 

Following a redesign of the software organization, Gerris became Basilisk, which allows one to develop its own solver (not necessarily in fluid mechanics) using various data  structures (including of course the quadtree/octree) and optimized operators for iteration, derivation, etc. Solvers are written in C, more specifically the Basilisk C.   
However many solvers are available "turnkey", including Navier-Stokes et Saint-Venant.

See also 

Other computing software are freely available in the field of fluid mechanics. Here are some of them (if the development was not initialized under a free license, the year when it moved to Open Source is mentioned in parenthesis):

Industrial fluids 
 Advanced Simulation Library (2015)
 Code Saturne (2007)
 FEATool Multiphysics (2013)
 OpenFOAM (2004)
 SU2 code (2012)

Geophysical fluids 
 POM (1999)
 ROMS
 GOTM
 Telemac (2010, 2011 for Mascaret)
 Delft3D (2011)

Notes

References

Free software
Computational fluid dynamics
Computer-aided engineering software for Linux
Scientific simulation software